A trade card is a square or rectangular card that is small, but bigger than the modern visiting card, and is exchanged in social circles, that a business distributes to clients and potential customers, as a kind of business card. Trade cards first became popular at the end of the 17th century in Paris, Lyon and London. They functioned as advertising and also as maps, directing the public to the merchants' stores (no formal street address numbering system existed at the time).

Definition
The term, trade card, refers to a varied group of items made of paper or of card of varying sizes and shapes. Trade cards evolved in different ways in Britain, America and Europe, giving rise to wide variation in their format and design. The characteristic features of a trade card are that it is a small printed item, used by merchants and traders to give to their customers for their use as an aid to memory. Trade cards were sufficiently small so that they could be carried in the gentleman's pocket or lady's purse.

History

In its original sense, the "trade" in trade card refers to its use by the proprietor of a business to announce his trade, or line of business. Trade cards were widely used by retailers and tradesmen from around the late 17th-century in Paris, Lyon and London. In the period before mass media, they functioned as advertising and also as maps, directing the public to the merchants' stores (no formal street address numbering system existed at the time). The trade card is an early example of the modern business card. The use of trade cards in America became widespread from the mid-19th-century in the period following the Civil war.

The earliest trade cards were not cards at all, instead they were printed on paper and did not include illustrations. Later they were printed on the more substantial card and typically bore the tradesmen's name and address, and before street numbering was in common use, often included a long-winded set of directions on how to locate the store or premises. With the advent of commercial engraving and lithography, illustrations became a standard feature of even the most humble trade card. Eventually trade cards evolved into business cards, which are still in use today.

Eighteenth century traders wanted cards with impact and sophistication. Accordingly, they often hired notable designers and engravers to design their cards. In 1738, for instance, when leading Parisian art dealer Edme-François Gersaint changed the name of his business to A la Pagode, he hired the engraver, François Boucher to design his card. In 1767, the French painter, Gabriel de Saint-Aubin, designed a trade card for quincailler (ironmonger), Perier, whose premises were situated at the sign of the Moor's Head on the Quai de la Megisserie in Paris. Other artists who accepted commissions for trade cards included: Hogarth, Bartolozzi and Bewick. The demand for trade cards, and also for catalogs fuelled demand for creative services such as etching, engraving and print-making in the first half of the eighteenth century.

Examples of early trade cards

Fuelled by the advent of color lithography and multi-color printing, trade cards entered their heyday in the late 19th-century. Businesses began to create increasingly sophisticated designs, using color printing. A few American companies specialized in producing stock cards, usually with an image on one side and space on the other side for the business to add its own information. In around 1850, Aristide Boucicaut, the founder of the department store Au Bon Marché used color printing to great effect when he seized on the idea of using the new chromolithography to offer a weekly advertising color print to children accompanied by their parents. This plan was so successful that it was soon emulated by other Parisian department stores. Cards for La Belle Jardiniére and La Galerie Lafayette soon followed.

The attractive and colorful designs spawned a passion for collecting trade cards, which became a popular hobby in the late 19th century. By moving into the realm of collecting, trade cards gave rise to the trading card, the meaning now shifting to the exchange or trade of cards by enthusiasts. Some cards, particularly those produced by tobacco companies featuring baseball players, later developed into collectibles and lost their function as a business advertisement.

The interest in collecting trade cards has ensured that many examples have survived. Collections of  rare trade cards, dating from the 17th-century to the 19th century can be found at the British Library,  Bodleian Library, Oxford, and Waddesdon Manor, Buckinghamshire. Another important collection of medical trade cards is the Wellcome Collection.

See also
 Advertising postcard
 Baseball card — the earliest baseball cards were trade cards
 Carte de visite 
 Cigarette card — a type of trade card packaged in tobacco products
 Postcard
 Prizes — trade cards were some of the earliest "prizes" packaged in retail products
 Trading card — successors of trade cards

References

Further reading
 Kit Barry, Reflections: Ephemera from Trades, Products, and Events,  [Vols. I and II], Kit Barry Ephemera Auctions, Brattleboro, VT, 1993, 1994 
 Maxine Berg and Helen Clifford, "Selling Consumption in the Eighteenth Century: Advertising and the Trade Card in Britain and France," Cultural & Social History (2007) 4#2 pp 145–170
 Robert Jay, The Trade Card in Nineteenth-Century America, Columbia, University of Missouri Press, 1987.

External links

Trade Card Valuations
Wellcome Collection of trade cards, 18th century to present
Victorian Tradecards
 Brooklyn Public Library: Fulton Street Trade Card Collection
Catalogue of heraldic tobacco and trading cards
 Iowa Digital Library: Victorian Trade Cards Digital Collection
Victorian Trade Card Collection on Flickr
 17th-18th century French and German Trade Card Collection at Waddesdon Manor Online
The HSP trade cards collection, which includes nineteenth century trade cards from Philadelphia and surrounding region, are available for research use at the Historical Society of Pennsylvania.

Business cards
Retail processes and techniques
Stationery
Advertising tools